Arthur Jackson (1853–1938) was an Irish politician. He was an independent member of Seanad Éireann from 1922 to 1928. From County Sligo, he was nominated to the Seanad by the President of the Executive Council in 1922 for 6 years. He did not contest the 1928 Seanad election.

Businessman and "the last of the great merchants who made Sligo famous as a trading port", Arthur Jackson was born in Belfast. He moved to Sligo in the 1870s, was High Sheriff of the county in 1899 and died at his home, Lisroyan House, Sligo, on 6 February 1938.

References

1853 births
1938 deaths
Independent members of Seanad Éireann
Members of the 1922 Seanad
Members of the 1925 Seanad
Politicians from County Sligo